Gregory Becker may refer to:

 Gregory R. Becker, American politician from New York
 Gregory W. Becker, American businessman and final CEO of Silicon Valley Bank (SVB)